Matatū is a New Zealand women's professional rugby union team that competes in the Super Rugby Aupiki competition. Matatū represents the South Island, specifically the regions covered by the Crusaders and the Highlanders. They are governed by the Crusaders.

History

Name, logo and colours 
The team’s name, logo and colours were officially unveiled on 12 October 2021. The name, logo and colours were created by a local artist and designer Morgan Mathews-Hale in partnership with Te Whaka Ako Limited. Matatū is a name gifted by Ngāi Tūāhuriri, which is one of five primary hapū of the Ngai Tahu iwi.

The name Matatū, literally meaning "alert or vigilant", has been gifted to symbolise the teams tūmanawa (determined sacrifice), tūaho (legacy), tūhono (connections) and tūtira (unity) in representing Te Waka o Aoraki (the South Island).

Coaching staff announced 
Blair Baxter was announced as Head Coach, Whitney Hansen and Tony Christie were appointed as the two assistant coaches.

Inaugural Super Rugby Aupiki season 
Matatū played their first game against the Chiefs Manawa in a pre-season match ahead of the inaugural Super Rugby Aupiki season at the Owen Delany Park in Taupō. Liv McGoverne kicked the teams first-ever points and Julia Gorinski scored their first try. Chiefs Manawa won the match 28–20. Matatū and Chiefs Manawa met five days later to play the inaugural Super Rugby Aupiki match on 10 March 2022. It was a historical moment for Matatū as this was their first team to take the field. It was a tense match but Chiefs Manawa edged Matatū 17–15 to win the second match between the teams. 

Matatū next played the Blues Women in round 2 of the competition, they lost the game 10–21. In the final round they faced Hurricanes Poua at the FMG Stadium Waikato in Hamilton, they were defeated 8–16 and finished last overall.

2023 
Matatū recorded their first Super Rugby Aupiki win after defeating Blues Women 33–31 in the opening round of the competition.

Current squad 
On 21 November 2022, the squad for the 2023 Super Rugby Aupiki season was announced.

Coaching staff 

 Head Coach: Blair Baxter
 Assistant Coach: Whitney Hansen (Set Piece)
 Assistant Coach: Tony Christie (Attack)
 Assistant Coach: Dan Cron (Scrum coach)

Captain 

  Alana Bremner (2022)

Coach 

Notes: Official Super Rugby Aupiki competition matches only, including finals.

References

External links 
 Official website

2021 establishments in New Zealand
Super Rugby Aupiki
New Zealand rugby union teams
Rugby clubs established in 2021
Sport in Canterbury, New Zealand